Jonathan Dismang (born July 30, 1979) is a Republican member of the Arkansas Senate. A resident of Beebe in White County near Little Rock, he has served in the Arkansas General Assembly since 2011. Dismang served as President Pro Tempore of the Arkansas Senate in the 90th Arkansas General Assembly and 91st Arkansas General Assembly.

Political Career
He served in the Arkansas House of Representatives before he was elected to the Arkansas Senate in 2010. From 2011 to 2013, he represented Senate District 29, which then included parts of White, Pulaski, and Faulkner counties.
 Following redistricting in 2013, Dismang represented District 28 until 2023, when he was redistricted into District 18.

Background
Dismang is a graduate of the Church of Christ-affiliated Harding University in Searcy in White County. He is chief financial officer of Whitwell and Ryles Real Estate Investments, LLC, and owns a cattle company.

References

External links
 Official page at the Arkansas General Assembly
 Campaign site
 

1979 births
21st-century American politicians
American chief financial officers
American members of the Churches of Christ
American real estate businesspeople
Republican Party Arkansas state senators
Businesspeople from Arkansas
Harding University alumni
Living people
Republican Party members of the Arkansas House of Representatives
People from Beebe, Arkansas
People from Randolph County, Arkansas